Giani Dhanwant Singh Sital (12 July 1912 - 3 April 1980) was an Indian Punjabi language writer who contributed to Punjabi literature through his poetry, Punjabi children books, songs and other work. Born in a Punjabi family, Sital has authored over 300 books, several songs and innumerable articles and earned several accolades and awards for the same including 2 Sahitya Academy Awards. He was a pioneer who brought colorful printed books to the Punjabi literature in the form of Punjabi children poetry and stories. Sital's work has been cited in Annual report of the registrar of newspapers for India, 1960.

List of works

List of Digitized books at Panjab Digital Library 
 Total of 14 books digitized and documented at Panjab Digital Library

Biographies 
 Sri Guru Nanak Dev Ji
 Sri Guru Angad Dev Ji
 Sri Guru Amar Das Ji
 Guru Amardas, the third Sikh guru's contribution to Sikh Indian society is unique. He is an embodiment of coexistence. This biographical account communicates Guru's teachings to child readers in an effective Punjabi prose. It is inspiring a motivational.
 Sri Guru Ram Das Ji
 Sri Guru Arjan Dev Ji
 Sri Guru Har Gobind Sahib
 Sri Guru Har Rai Ji
 Sri Guru Har Krishan Ji
 Sri Guru Tegh Bahadur Ji
 Sri Guru Gobind Singh Ji
 Maharaja Ranjit Singh Ji
 Akali Phoola Singh Ji
 Sardar Hari Singh Nalwa
 Lives of veteran Sikh warriors are a source of inspiration for younger generations. This pen-portrait of the Sikh general is impressive, inspiring and motivating. Illustrations add to its impact. It is a fine specimen of Punjabi "Bal Sahit".
 Mahatma Gandhi Ji
 Pandit Jawaharlal Nehru
 Sardar Patel
 Sri Subhash Chandra Bose

Poetry 

 Meeh Vasa De Joro Jor
 This well-illustrated poetic verse written for children evoke feelings of patriotism, and love for nature's beauty. The poems are lyrical, child friendly and easily recitative and memorable. It is a right stuff for children's literature.
 Seetal Mithaiyaan
 These lyrics replete with humour, wisdom, and commonsense delight child readers, inculcate habit of reading and curiosity, to learn better things of life. The verse is fluent, communicative and appealing.
 Seetal Kyari
 The tales about beasts in poetic verse in Punjabi inspire, entertain and motivate the child readers with good habits, moral values and wisdom. It is a fine children's literature.
 Seetal Rasgulle
 As the title is suggestive, these humorous anecdotal tales in Punjabi verse are rib tickling and witty and humorous. Child readers are bound to feel delighted and educated as well

Short stories 
 Ik Si Bakrota
 Nina Pari
 Nilu te us da ghuleyala - credit to Mohanbir Singh Kochhar for making this video
 Arab da saudaghar - credit to Mohanbir Singh Kochhar for making this video
 Lal Badshah
 Saral Kahaaniyan
 Short stories for children should be entertaining, instructive anecdotal and written in easy to understand language and diction. The stories in this collection fulfill all these standards and attract children's attention. It is a fine specimen of children's literature in Punjabi
 Jadu Diyan Kahaniyaan
 Fairy tales, miraculous feats, stories about magic, supernatural phenomena are the stuff of grandmother's tales in vernacular Punjabi. These three stories fill the child reader's mind with sense of wonder, excitement and inculcate the habit of reading and inquisitiveness.

Monthly Newspaper 
 Sital Sangeet

Life and events 

 1979, Honoured by Golden Temple at Manji Sahib Gurdwara in Amritsar, Punjab.
 16th September 1975, Giani Zail Singh, then Chief Minister of Punjab, graced the occasion of Sital Sanman Samaroh, day dedicated in honor of Giani Dhanwant Singh Sital. Circa 1975. Giani Zail Singh later became the First Sikh President of India. 
 03rd May 1959, Srimati Indira Gandhi, performing the ribbon cutting ceremony of Sital College, Amritsar. Giani Dhanwant Singh Sital, in white turban, standing on the left side of Indira Gandhi. Sardarni Pratap Singh Kairon standing alongside. Indira Gandhi was President of All India Congress Committee that time. Circa 1959.

Impact and legacy

References 
Citations

1912 births
1980 deaths
Indian Sikhs
Punjabi-language poets
People from Gujranwala
Punjabi people